Joseph Luns (1911 - 2002), a Dutch diplomat, politician and fifth Secretary General of the NATO.
Huib Luns (1881 - 1942), a Dutch artist and author, father of Joseph Luns
Logical Unit Number is the identifier of a SCSI logical unit.